Paul Shortino (born May 14, 1953) is an American rock singer and musician who has sung for Rough Cutt/The Cutt, Quiet Riot, Bad Boyz, and Shortino. He briefly recorded with J.K. Northrup as the duo, Shortino/Northrup. He has also recorded as a solo artist, writing and performing the song "E.G.G.M.A.N." as the theme for Dr. Eggman in Sonic Adventure 2 for Sega, and in Shadow the Hedgehog as "E.G.G.M.A.N. Doc Robeatnix Mix".  Shortino recorded lead vocals for the Heavy Metal benefit project Hear 'n Aid in 1985.  The single from this project, "Stars", also features lead vocals by heavy metal singers Ronnie James Dio, Rob Halford, Geoff Tate, Don Dokken, Kevin DuBrow, Eric Bloom and Dave Meniketti.

Shortino is currently a member of the band King Kobra, and also performs in the cast of Raiding the Rock Vault at the Hard Rock Hotel and Casino in Las Vegas.

Acting
Shortino played the character "Duke Fame" in the film, This Is Spinal Tap, and reprised this role in the first webisode by Las Vegas-based group Sin City Sinners. He resides in Las Vegas with his wife Carmen, and is a regular guest of the Sinners.

Discography

With Rough Cutt
 "Used And Abused" and "A Little Kindness" (1981)
Rough Cutt (1985)
Wants You! (1986)
Rough Cutt Live (1996)
Sneak Peek EP (2000)
Anthology (2008)
Rough Cutt 3 (2021)

With The Cutt
Sacred Place (2002)

With Quiet Riot
QR (1988)

With Badd Boyz
Badd Boyz (1993)

With Shortino
It's About Time (1997)
Booked, Toured, ...Released! (1999)
Chasing My Dream (2009)
Make A Wish (2020)

With Shortino/Northrup
Back on Track (1993)
Afterlife (2004)

Paul Shortino & the Rhythm Junkies
Stand or Fall (1999)

Hear 'n Aid
 Hear 'n Aid - "Stars" (1986)

With King Kobra
King Kobra (2011)
King Kobra II (2013)

With Michael Cosyn Group
Burn The Earth (2015)

With Appice 
 Sinister (2017)

References

External links
 Official website
 raidingtherockvault.com

American heavy metal singers
Glam metal musicians
Rough Cutt members
Quiet Riot members
Living people
American people of Italian descent
1953 births
King Kobra members